The University of Madagascar was the former name of the centralized public university system in Madagascar, although the original branch in Antananarivo is still sometimes called by that name.

The system traces its history to 16 December 1955, and the formation of the Institute for Advanced Studies in the capital Antananarivo.  It quickly established itself as the main center for higher education in the country, and was renamed the University of Madagascar in 1961.  The main branch opened five more branches in Antsiranana, Fianarantsoa, Toamasina, Toliara, and Mahajanga.

In 1988, all branches of the system became independent of each other, and the name University of Madagascar was dropped in favor of more geography-specific titles.

See also

List of split up universities
University of Antananarivo
University of Toamasina
University of Toliara
Museum of Art and Archaeology

External links
International Network for Higher Education in Africa profile:Madagascar

Educational institutions established in 1955
Defunct universities and colleges
Universities in Madagascar
Antananarivo
Educational institutions disestablished in 1988
1955 establishments in Madagascar